Aamna Malick (born 5 August 1997) is a Pakistani actress. She made her debut with Dumpukht on A-Plus TV and later went on to other serials including Dar Si Jaati Hai Sila, Meri Saheli Meri Bhabi, Farz, Mera Dil Mera Dushman and Yeh Na Thi Hamari Qismat.

In 2022, she was seen in web series Mrs. & Mr. Shameem. Malick was recently seen as contestant on ARY Digital's reality show Tamasha.

Television

Web series

References

External links 
 

Living people
Pakistani television actresses
21st-century Pakistani actresses
Pakistani film actresses
1997 births